Enrico Bertaggia (born 19 September 1964) is a former racing driver from Italy. He enjoyed success in Formula Three, winning the Italian Formula Three Championship in 1987 and the Monaco Grand Prix F3 support race and the Macau Grand Prix the following year.

Racing career

As a professional race car driver, Bertaggia began his career in 1982 and continued for almost 25 years. He entered many prestigious and difficult Championship Races including Formula 3 where he was the Italian Formula 3 Champion in 1987, and in 1988, when he succeeded in the feat of winning both the Formula 3 race in Monte Carlo and the Macau Grand Prix with Damon Hill coming in second and Jean Alesi in third position. He made his debut in Formula 3000 in 1988. In the 1988 International Formula 3000 Championship he was entered in four races, failed to qualify in the first three and then managed a "career-best" 19th position at Jerez.

In 1989 he obtained a Formula One ride with Coloni, replacing Pierre-Henri Raphanel. He participated in six races towards the end of the season and was in fact the slowest entrant in all six. He was entered for two Grand Prix with Andrea Moda in 1992, but the team was excluded from the first, and withdrew from the second, following which Bertaggia left the team. He made an attempt to return to Andrea Moda with a new sponsorship deal, but owner Andrea Sassetti had already used up his allowed number of driver changes.

In 1990 and 1991 Bertaggia raced Formula 3000 in Japan with the Footwork team. In 1995 he was runner up at the 24 Hours of Le Mans in the GT2 class with Callaway Corvette.

His career continued and included Super Touring Car Championships, Porsche Carrera Cup and Sportscar Racing.

Coaching

Bertaggia has worked as the Chief Instructor at the Italian Federal School for young and talented race car drivers, which has been exclusively granting national professional racing licenses since 1992. After working at various professional driving schools (BMW, Renault) in 1987 Enrico Bertaggia became the Course Director for the Official Ferrari Driving School and the only instructor worldwide to teach the private glamorous Ferrari Enzo Courses. He was also Chief Instructor at the Alfa Romeo safety driving school and the Maserati Master GT School.

In February 2005 Bertaggia joined the staff at Ferrari GB as Chief Instructor for the exclusive and prestigious Ferrari GB official Club “Fiorano Ferrari”. He was made MotorSports Director at Ferrari GB and has created a 6 car team for the Ferrari European Challenge races as well as continuing to take the responsibility for the "Fiorano Ferrari" track days.

Business ventures

In 2011 Bertaggia moved to the United States to create as part owner Dream Racing, a 5 Star Luxury Driving Experience based at the Las Vegas Motor Speedway. He is since then the CEO of the company, which initially offered 12 Ferrari F430 GT Race Cars to drive for customers, since then the fleet has grown to over 80 cars which includes both GT race cars and supercars, and hosts more than 60,000 customers per year. In 2016 Dream Racing also launched Dream Racing motor sport.

Racing record

Complete International Formula 3000 results
(key) (Races in bold indicate pole position) (Races 
in italics indicate fastest lap)

Complete Japanese Formula 3000 Championship results
(key) (Races in bold indicate pole position) (Races in italics indicate fastest lap)

Complete Formula One results
(key)

Complete British Formula Two Championship results
(key) (Races in bold indicate pole position) (Races 
in italics indicate fastest lap)

24 Hours of Le Mans results

References
Profile at grandprix.com

1964 births
Living people
Italian racing drivers
Italian Formula One drivers
British Formula 3000 Championship drivers
Japanese Formula 3000 Championship drivers
Italian Formula Three Championship drivers
24 Hours of Le Mans drivers
24 Hours of Daytona drivers
Sportspeople from the Metropolitan City of Venice
International Formula 3000 drivers
Porsche Supercup drivers
Andrea Moda Formula One drivers
Coloni Formula One drivers
Durango drivers